Polaribacter irgensii is a species of gas vacuolate polar marine bacteria. It was first isolated from sea ice and water from the Arctic and the Antarctic. Its type strain is ATCC 700398.

References

External links
LPSN lpsn.dsmz.de
Type strain of Polaribacter irgensii at BacDive -  the Bacterial Diversity Metadatabase

Flavobacteria
Bacteria described in 1998